Good-Time Girl is a 1948 British film noir-crime drama film directed by David MacDonald and starring Jean Kent, Dennis Price and Herbert Lom. A homeless girl is asked to explain her bad behaviour in the juvenile court, and says she’s run away from home because she’s unhappy there. They explain in detail what happened to the last girl who thought she could cope on her own, and this becomes the main plot.

Plot
The film opens with Miss Thorpe, chairwoman of the Juvenile Court, giving advice to troubled teenager Lyla Lawrence. Miss Thorpe tells Lyla that her life has a similar beginning to that of Gwen Rawlings. She then recounts Gwen's story in a series of flashbacks.

Gwen is a 16-year-old girl who repeatedly falls in with the wrong crowd. Her troubles begin with her employer, a pawnbroker, who catches her "borrowing" a brooch from his shop. Although Gwen had only borrowed it to wear at a dance and had every intention of returning it, she is fired. When she arrives home and informs her father, he beats her. The next day Gwen packs her things and moves into a boarding house. There she meets Jimmy Rosso, a sharply-dressed man who immediately takes a liking to her good looks, telling her he could get her a job at the club where he works.

Jimmy tells her to go to the Blue Angel night club, where she meets his employer Max Vine, the boss. Having checked out her shapely legs he employs her as a hat-check girl. While working she meets "Red" Farrell, a member of the club’s band, who feels the need to look after her well-being. Jimmy attempts to pursue Gwen but is rejected. He grows angry about the growing relationship between Red and Gwen and beats her. Max discovers what Jimmy has done and fires him. Angry at Gwen, who he feels has lost him his job, Jimmy plots to betray her. He steals their landlady's jewellery and tells Gwen to pawn it for him. Believing that the jewellery belonged to his mother, Gwen follows his instructions. Later, after learning that Max had been attacked by a gang, Gwen doesn't want to go back to her lodgings because of Jimmy. Neither does she want to go to her parents because of her father, so Red takes her back to his place. Red lets her have a bath and allows her a night's stay but insists that she leave the following day when they will search for new lodgings for her. When watching the movie, the name of the night club is articulated as being something similar sounding to Swan's Down, rather than Blue Angel.

However, the police soon find Gwen and she is sent to court where she is accused of having stolen jewellery. Believing Jimmy's lies and discounting Red's evidence that Gwen is innocent, Miss Thorpe, presiding over the hearing, decides to send her to an approved school for three years. The child welfare officer allows Red to see Gwen before she is taken and they steal a passionate kiss.

During a school fight Gwen runs away and finds Max, who has opened another club, in Brighton.Max is reluctant to take her back but as she’s clearly desperate, he gives her a job. Gwen soon becomes close to Danny Martin, a regular at the club. One drunken night both are out for a drive when they accidentally hit and kill a police officer. Danny forbids anyone from speaking to the police. However, once Danny is questioned Gwen flees.

Danny later finds Gwen and beats her. Gwen is found and helped by two American soldiers who are AWOL. They decide to band together and become petty criminals in London. After becoming too well known in the city for their crimes, they decide to head to Manchester. As they flag down a car to steal, Gwen immediately recognises that the driver of the car is Red. When her companions see the two know each other, they shoot Red dead. All three are eventually caught and tried for their crimes, and Gwen is sentenced to serve fifteen years in prison.

At the end of the film, a chastened Lyla thanks Miss Thorpe and decides to head home.

Cast

Jean Kent as Gwen Rawlings 
 Dennis Price as Michael 'Red' Farrell 
 Herbert Lom as Max Vine 
 Bonar Colleano as Micky Malone 
 Peter Glenville as Jimmy Rosso 
 Flora Robson as Miss Thorpe 
 George Carney as Mr. Rawlings 
 Beatrice Varley as Mrs. Rawlings 
 Hugh McDermott as Al Schwartz 
 Griffith Jones as Danny Martin 
 Amy Veness as Mrs. Chalk 
 Elwyn Brook-Jones as Mr. Pottinger 
 Orlando Martins as Kolly 
 Renee Gadd as Mrs. Parsons 
 Jill Balcon as Roberta 
 Joan Young as Mrs. Bond 
 Margaret Barton as Agnes 
 Jack Raine as Detective Inspector Girton 
 Nora Swinburne as Miss Mills 
 Diana Dors as Lyla Lawrence 
 George Merritt as Police Sergeant 
 Michael Hordern as Seddon 
 Garry Marsh as Mr. Hawkins 
 Harry Ross as Fruity Lee 
 Dorothy Vernon as Mrs. Chudd 
 Vera Frances as Edie Rawlings 
 June Byford as Joan Rawlings 
 John Blythe as Art Moody 
 Edward Lexy as Mr. Morgan 
 Phyl French as Sonia 
 Danny Green as Smiling Billy 
 Noel Howlett as Clerk 
 Mollie Palmer as Reform school girl 
 Zena Marshall as Annie Farrell 
 Ilena Sylva as Ida 
 Betty Nelson as Connie 
 Rosalind Atkinson as Doctor 
 Iris Vandeleur as Lodger 
 Jane Hylton as Doris 
 Lionel Grose as Silver Slipper doorman 
 Arthur Hambling as Policeman At Park Gates 
 Tommy Duggan as MP 
 Jim O'Brady as Max's attacker 
 Wally Patch as Bookie 
 Phyllis Stanley as Ida

Production
The film was originally known as Bad Girl. It was based on Arthur La Bern's 1947 novel Night Darkens the Street. It was shot at Islington Studios and on location around London. The film's sets were designed by the art directors Maurice Carter and George Provis.

Release
The film was originally banned by the British censor for its dialogue.

Trade papers called the film a "notable box office attraction" in British cinemas in 1948.

Critical reception
The New York Times concluded that "even the commendable acting in Good Time Girl does not bring it out of the minor melodrama class"; whereas The Monthly Film Bulletin found the film "Tensely gripping in its seamiest situations, it holds the interest to the end and makes the heart beat faster...Apart from perfect direction, fine photography, and good acting, the story makes one think and argue"; and in The Spectator, Virginia Graham wrote "Good Time Girl makes a shot at dealing seriously and honestly with the problem of juvenile delinquency, and it does not fall too short of the mark."

Financially, the film was not a great success with box office takings (£177,000 at 1953) slightly under its production costs of £180,000.

See also

Cautionary tale

References

External links

Review of film at Variety

1948 films
1948 crime drama films
British crime drama films
British crime thriller films
British black-and-white films
Films with screenplays by Muriel Box
Films with screenplays by Sydney Box
Films with screenplays by Ted Willis, Baron Willis
Films produced by Sydney Box
Films based on British novels
Eagle-Lion Films films
Films directed by David MacDonald (director)
1940s crime thriller films
Film noir
1940s English-language films
1940s British films
Gainsborough Pictures films
Islington Studios films
Films shot in London
Films set in London